Leung Man-tao (born 26 December 1970) is a Hong Kong writer, critic and host.

Life
Leung was born in a Catholic family in Hong Kong on December 26, 1970, with his ancestral home in Shunde, Guangdong. Leung was raised primarily in Taiwan, returning to Hong Kong only during high school.Leung graduated from Chinese University of Hong Kong, where he majored in philosophy at the Chung Chi College.

In 1998, Leung hosted Teacup in a Storm in Metro Broadcast Corporation.

In 1999, Leung joined the Phoenix Television and began attending Qiangqiang Sanrenxing (also referred to as Behind the Headlines with Wentao) hosted by Dou Wentao since that year.

In 2008, Leung converted to Theravada Buddhism.

Works

References

External links

 

1970 births
Living people
Hong Kong television presenters
Hong Kong radio presenters
Hong Kong food writers
Hong Kong writers
Hong Kong columnists
Chinese restaurant critics
Alumni of the Chinese University of Hong Kong
Charter 08 signatories
Converts to Buddhism
Hong Kong Buddhists
Converts to Buddhism from Roman Catholicism
Hong Kong Theravada Buddhists
Hong Kong former Christians
Cantonese people